Jed Fernley Wallace (born 26 March 1994) is an English professional footballer who plays as a winger for EFL Championship club West Bromwich Albion.

Beginning in non-league football, Wallace broke into Portsmouth's first team in 2013, going on to become a regular player for them and being named in the League Two PFA Team of the Year along with 2015 Player of the Season award before moving to Wolves in 2015.

Career

Youth and non-League football
Born in Reading, Berkshire, Wallace was educated at Frogmore Community College. He began his career playing for youth club Darby Green (now known as Darby Green & Potley F.C.) and Carshalton Athletic's youth team, before signing with Farnborough. At Farnborough, he appeared on the bench on 29 January 2011, in a match against Havant & Waterlooville. However, he did not enter the field. In August 2011, he signed for Lewes, following his manager at Farnborough, Steve King. Wallace played in three friendly matches for Lewes, before then signing a two-year professional contract (with an option of a further year) with Portsmouth.

Portsmouth
Wallace progressed through Portsmouth's reserve and academy. On 20 March 2012, Wallace returned to Farnborough on a one-month loan deal, making his debut the following day in a match against Dover Athletic in the first of six appearances for the club. Having returned to Portsmouth in April 2012, he appeared on the bench for the first time, in a loss at Nottingham Forest.

The start of the 2012–13 season saw Wallace make his senior Portsmouth debut as he started a League Cup 3–0 defeat against Plymouth Argyle on 14 August 2012. After no further first team appearances over the following weeks, he was loaned to Isthmian League side Whitehawk for a month in October 2012 to gain playing time. After scoring on his debut, in a 3–1 win over Wingate & Finchley, he netted his first a hat-trick in a 5–0 win against Merstham a few weeks later. His loan ended in mid-November but was then renewed several times over the following weeks.

On Christmas Eve 2012, Wallace was recalled from loan and named as a substitute against Yeovil. He made his league debut on 1 January 2013, coming on as a substitute in a 0–5 defeat at Swindon. He scored his first goal for the club in the first match he started for them, a 1–3 home defeat against Hartlepool on 26 January. He finished the season with six goals, but could not prevent Pompey dropping into League Two, upon which the club exercised the one-year contract extension in Wallace's deal.

After beginning the 2013–14 season in the first team, Wallace found himself often dropped to the bench after the arrival of Richie Barker as manager. Wallace turned down two offers of a new contract from Portsmouth, and in November 2013 his teammate David Connolly revealed that clubs were submitting bids for him. In January 2014, Wallace turned down another offer from Pompey, but the club rejected a reported £250,000 bid from Peterborough. Having returned to being a regular starting player after the dismissal of Barker and appointment of former academy manager Andy Awford as manager, Wallace re-entered contract talks at the end of the season. In June 2014, Wallace signed a new three-year deal.

Despite this new contract, Wallace continued to be linked to moves, with speculation that Brighton were interested in him, but no official bid was ultimately entered. He ended the 2014–15 season as the club's top goalscorer with 17 goals, also winning him the club's Player of the Season Award. He was also included in the League Two PFA Team of the Year.

Wolverhampton Wanderers
On 21 May 2015, Wallace signed a three-year deal with Championship club Wolverhampton Wanderers for an undisclosed fee.

On 8 January 2016, Wallace joined League One club Millwall on a month-long-loan, making his debut for the Lions the following day, against Oldham. Wallace's first assist for the Lions came on 17 January 2016, in a League One tie against Port Vale at The Den. The assist came only 14 minutes into the game, with a sublime cross that found the head of Lee Gregory who finished first time, placing it past The Valiants' goalkeeper Jak Alnwick. He scored his first goal for Millwall in a 3–0 win over Blackpool on 5 March 2016.

Upon his return to Wolves he scored his first goal for the club in a 2–1 EFL Cup win against Cambridge United on 23 August 2016.

On 19 January 2017 Wallace was again loaned to Millwall from Wolverhampton Wanderers, this time until the end of the season with a view to a permanent move when the loan period expires.

Millwall
On 26 June 2017, Millwall announced the permanent signing of Wallace on a 3-year deal for an undisclosed fee following 2 loan spells at the club.

West Bromwich Albion 
On 23 June 2022, West Bromwich Albion announced the permanent signing of Wallace on a 4-year deal on a free transfer after his contract ran out at his previous club.

International career
On 13 March 2013, Wallace was named on the standby list for the England U19 game vs Turkey, on 21 March 2013. He was called up again on 2 May, for the 2013 UEFA U19 Championship qualification rounds, against Belgium and Scotland.

On 24 May, Wallace was an unused substitute in a match against Georgia U19's. Five days later, he made international debut, starting in a 3–0 victory against Scotland U19's.

Career statistics

Honours
Millwall
EFL League One play-offs: 2017

Individual
PFA Team of the Year: 2014–15 League Two

References

External links

1994 births
Living people
Sportspeople from Reading, Berkshire
Footballers from Berkshire
English footballers
Association football midfielders
Farnborough F.C. players
Lewes F.C. players
Portsmouth F.C. players
Whitehawk F.C. players
Wolverhampton Wanderers F.C. players
Millwall F.C. players
West Bromwich Albion F.C. players
National League (English football) players
Isthmian League players
English Football League players
England youth international footballers